Rafael Luis Araneda Maturana  (born September 18, 1969, in Santiago) is a popular Chilean TV presenter, best known for his participation in the show Rojo Fama Contrafama as the host. Also he was the host of Estrellas en el Hielo, Sin Prejuicios, Rojo VIP, Noche de Juegos, El Baile en TVN (Chilean version of Strictly Come Dancing by the BBC). Rafael Araneda is married to the hostess Marcela Vacarezza Etcheverry and they have three children.

Araneda started his career in La Red being the host of Revolviéndola (1997). Is one of the biggest collaborators of the Teletón and is one of the best friends of Mario Kreutzberger "Don Francisco". Recently was the host of Todos a Coro with Karen Doggenweiler and Pelotón III.Currently works in Pelotón IV'''.

He hosted La Academia Mexico Season 6, 7, 8 & 9. , Araneda works in the United States on a Univision television show named Enamorandonos USA''.

References

External links
 

1969 births
Chilean television presenters
Living people
Chilean people of Basque descent
People from Santiago
Chilean expatriates in Mexico
Chilean television personalities